It's My Life (stylized in all caps) is a Japanese web manga series written and illustrated by Imomushi Narita. It was published on Shogakukan's manga apps MangaONE and Ura Sunday from December 2014 to August 2018, with its chapters collected in eleven tankōbon volumes. An original video animation adaptation by Creators in Pack was released in January 2019.

Characters

Media

Manga
Shogakukan collected its chapters in eleven tankōbon volumes, released from March 12, 2015, to October 19, 2018.

Volume list

Original video animation
A 15-minute original video animation animated by Creators in Pack and directed by Hisayoshi Hirasawa, created through a crowdfunding campaign, was released on DVD on January 30, 2019.

References

External links
  
 

Creators in Pack
Fantasy anime and manga
Japanese webcomics
OVAs based on manga
Shōnen manga
Shogakukan manga
Webcomics in print